P. Vetriivel is an Indian politician and was Member of the 14th Tamil Nadu Legislative Assembly from the Dr. Radhakrishnan Nagar Constituency in Chennai District. He resigned as member of the Tamil Nadu Legislative Assembly in 2015 to pave way for the former Tamil Nadu Chief Minister to contest as an MLA from his constituency.

References 

Tamil Nadu MLAs 2011–2016
All India Anna Dravida Munnetra Kazhagam politicians
Living people
Politicians from Chennai
Year of birth missing (living people)